This is a list of works by American jazz musician Milt Hinton.

As leader 
78s include:
 "Everywhere" and "Beefsteak Charlie" (Keynote 639): rec. 1945
 "And Say It Again" (Staff 604): rec. 1947
 "Just Plain Blues" (Staff 605): rec. 1947
 "If You Believed in Me" (Staff 606): rec. 1947
 "Meditation Jeffonese" (Staff 608): rec. 1947
LPs include:
 Milt Hinton: East Coast Jazz 5 (Bethlehem BCP10): rec. 1955
 Basses Loaded (RCA LPM1107): rec. 1955
 The Rhythm Section (Epic LN3271): rec. 1956
 Percussion and Bass (Everest BR5110): rec. 1960 with Jo Jones
 Here Swings the Judge (Famous Door HL104): rec. 1964 and 1975
 Bassically with Blue (Black and Blue 33096): rec. 1976
 The Trio (Chiaroscuro CR188): rec. 1977
 Just the Two of Us (Muse 5279): rec. 1981
 The Judge's Decision (Exposure 6231910): rec. 1984
CDs include:
 Back to Bass-ics (Progressive PCD7084): rec. 1984
 Hayward and Hinton (Town Crier TCD514): rec. 1987
 The Basement Tapes (Chiaroscuro CRD222): rec. 1989 and 1990
 Old Man Time (Chiaroscuro CRD310): rec. 1989 and 1990
 Marian McPartland's Piano Jazz with Guest Milt Hinton (Jazz Alliance 12016): rec. 1991
 The Trio 1994 (Chiaroscuro CRD322): rec. 1994
 Laughing at Life (Columbia CK66454): rec. 1994
 The Judge at His Best: The Legendary Chiaroscuro Sessions, 1973-1995 (Chiaroscuro CRD219): rec. 1973-1995

As sideman 
With Louis Bellson and Gene Krupa
The Mighty Two (Roulette, 1963)
With Bob Brookmeyer
Brookmeyer (Vik, 1956)
Jazz Concerto Grosso (ABC-Paramount, 1957) with Gerry Mulligan and Phil Sunkel 
With John Benson Brooks
Alabama Concerto (Riverside, 1958) – with Cannonball Adderley
With Clarence "Gatemouth" Brown
Heatwave (Black & Blue, 1977)
With Ruth Brown 
Late Date with Ruth Brown (Atlantic, 1959)
With Kenny Burrell
Blue Bash! (Verve, 1963) – with Jimmy Smith
With Benny Carter
Wonderland (Pablo, 1976 [1986])
With Buck Clayton
Jumpin' at the Woodside (Columbia, 1955)
All the Cats Join In (Columbia, 1956)
With Al Cohn
Mr. Music (RCA Victor, 1955)
The Natural Seven (RCA Victor, 1955)
That Old Feeling (RCA Victor, 1955)
From A to...Z (RCA Victor, 1956) with Zoot Sims
The Sax Section (Epic, 1956)
Cohn on the Saxophone (Dawn, 1956)
With Sam Cooke 
Swing Low (RCA Victor, 1961)
With Jimmy Cleveland
Rhythm Crazy (EmArcy, 1959 [1964])
With Freddy Cole
Waiter, Ask the Man to Play the Blues (Dot, 1964)
With Bobby Darin
That's All (Atco, 1959)
With Joey DeFrancesco
Where Were You? (Columbia, 1990)
With Paul Desmond 
Desmond Blue (RCA Victor, 1961)
With Dion DiMucci
 Runaround Sue (Laurie Records, 1961)
With Ricky Ford
Manhattan Blues (Candid, 1989)
Ebony Rhapsody (Candid, 1990)
American-African Blues (Candid, 1991)
With Aretha Franklin 
Aretha: With The Ray Bryant Combo (Columbia, 1961)
With Curtis Fuller
Images of Curtis Fuller (Savoy, 1960)
Cabin in the Sky (Impulse!, 1962)
With Dizzy Gillespie
The Complete RCA Victor Recordings (Bluebird, 1937-1949, [1995])
With Steve Goodman
Say It in Private (Asylum Records, 1977)
With Freddie Green
Mr. Rhythm (RCA Victor, 1955)
With Dodo Greene
My Hour of Need (Blue Note, 1962) 
With Al Grey
Struttin' and Shoutin' (Columbia, 1976 [1983])
With Gigi Gryce
Gigi Gryce (MetroJazz, 1958)
With Lionel Hampton
You Better Know It!!! (Impulse!, 1965)
With Cass Harrison
Wrappin' It Up (MGM, 1957)
With Coleman Hawkins
Timeless Jazz (Jazztone, 1954)
The Hawk in Hi Fi (RCA Victor, 1956)
Jazz Reunion (Candid, 1961) with Pee Wee Russell
With Woody Herman
Songs for Hip Lovers (Verve, 1957)
With Johnny Hodges
Sandy's Gone (Verve, 1963)
Con-Soul & Sax (RCA Victor, 1965) with Wild Bill Davis
Triple Play (RCA Victor, 1967)
Don't Sleep in the Subway (Verve, 1967)
With John Lee Hooker
It Serve You Right to Suffer (Impulse! Records, 1966)
With Langston Hughes
Weary Blues (MGM, 1958)
With Milt Jackson
The Ballad Artistry of Milt Jackson (Atlantic, 1959)
With Willis Jackson
Cool "Gator" (Prestige, 1960)
Blue Gator (Prestige, 1960)
Cookin' Sherry (Prestige, 1960)
Together Again! (Prestige, 1960 [1965]) - with Jack McDuff
Together Again, Again (Prestige, 1960 [1966]) - with Jack McDuff
With Budd Johnson
French Cookin' (Argo, 1963)
With J. J. Johnson and Kai Winding
K + J.J. (Bethlehem, 1955)
Jay and Kai (Columbia, 1957)
With Elvin Jones
Time Capsule (Vanguard, 1977)
With Etta Jones
Etta Jones Sings (Roulette, 1965)
I'll Be Seeing You (Muse, 1987)
With Hank Jones
The Talented Touch (Capitol, 1958)
Porgy and Bess (Capitol, 1958)
Here's Love (Argo, 1963)
This Is Ragtime Now! (ABC-Paramount, 1964)
With Quincy Jones
The Birth of a Band! (Mercury, 1959)
Quincy Jones Explores the Music of Henry Mancini (Mercury, 1964)
Golden Boy (Mercury, 1964)
Quincy Plays for Pussycats (Mercury, 1959-65 [1965])
With Alex Kallao
An Evening at the Embers (RCA Victor, 1954)
With Eddie Kendricks
Vintage '78 (Arista, 1978)
With Mundell Lowe
New Music of Alec Wilder (Riverside, 1956)
With Johnny Lytle
Got That Feeling! (Riverside, 1963)
With Herbie Mann
Love and the Weather (Bethlehem, 1956) 
Our Mann Flute (Atlantic, 1966)
With Branford Marsalis
Trio Jeepy (CBS Records, 1989)
With Howard McGhee
Music from the Connection (Felsted, 1960)
With Jay McShann
The Last of the Blue Devils (Atlantic, 1978)
Some Blues (Chiaroscuro, 1993)
With Helen Merrill
Helen Merrill with Strings (EmArcy, 1955)
Merrill at Midnight (EmArcy, 1957)
You've Got a Date with the Blues (MetroJazz, 1959)
With Bette Midler
The Divine Miss M (Atlantic Records, 1972)
Bette Midler (Atlantic Records, 1973)
Songs for the New Depression (Atlantic Records, 1976)
With Charles Mingus
The Complete Town Hall Concert (Blue Note, 1962 [1994])
Charles Mingus and Friends in Concert (Columbia, 1972)
With Willie Nelson
Across the Borderline (Columbia, 1993)
With Joe Newman
All I Wanna Do Is Swing (RCA Victor, 1955)
New Sounds in Swing (Jazztone, 1956) with Billy Byers
I Feel Like a Newman (Storyville, 1956)
With Esther Phillips
And I Love Him! (Atlantic, 1966)
With Ike Quebec
Heavy Soul (Blue Note, 1961)
It Might as Well Be Spring (Blue Note, 1961)
Easy Living (Blue Note, 1962)
With Irene Reid
It's Only the Beginning (MGM, 1963)
With Leon Redbone
On the Track (Warner Bros., 1975)
Double Time (Warner Bros., 1977)
With Jordan Sandke
Rhythm Is Our Business (Stash, 1985)
With Zoot Sims
The Modern Art of Jazz by Zoot Sims (Dawn, 1956)
Nirvana (Groove Merchant, 1974) with Bucky Pizzarelli and special guest Buddy Rich
With Rex Stewart and Cootie Williams
The Big Challenge (Jazztone, 1957)
Porgy & Bess Revisited (Warner Bros., 1959)
With Sonny Stitt
Broadway Soul (Colpix, 1965)
The Matadors Meet the Bull (Roulette, 1965)
I Keep Comin' Back! (Roulette, 1966)
With Ralph Sutton
Last of the Whorehouse Piano Players  (Chaz Jazz, 1980) with Jay McShann - originally released on 2 LPs as The Last of the Whorehouse Piano Players: Two Pianos Vol. I & Vol. II 
Last of the Whorehouse Piano Players (Chiaroscuro), with Jay McShann
Remembered (Arbors Records) with Ruby Braff
With Sylvia Syms
Sylvia Is! (Prestige, 1965)
With Buddy Tate
Buddy Tate and His Buddies (Chiaroscuro, 1973)
With Clark Terry
The Happy Horns of Clark Terry (Impulse!, 1964)
With Ben Webster
The Soul of Ben Webster (Verve, 1958)
With Joe Wilder
The Pretty Sound (Columbia, 1959)
With Joe Williams
Me and the Blues (RCA Victor, 1964)
With Teddy Wilson
The Creative Teddy Wilson (Norgran, 1955) - also released as For Quiet Lovers
The Teddy Wilson Trio & Gerry Mulligan Quartet with Bob Brookmeyer at Newport (Verve, 1957)
With Kai Winding 
Dance to the City Beat (Columbia, 1959)

Select photographic exhibitions

References 

Discographies of American artists